"Goodbye Girl" is a song by David Gates, lead singer of Bread, which was released as a single in December 1977 following the premiere of the hit film of the same name. As the theme song to the film, the song reached number 15 on the Billboard Hot 100, becoming the biggest hit of Gates' solo career. It also reached number three on the Adult Contemporary chart. The song is from Gates' third solo album of the same name, released the following year.

Personnel
 David Gates – vocals, piano, bass, acoustic guitar
 Dean Parks – electric guitar
 Mike Botts – drums

Chart history

Weekly charts

Year-end charts

Cover versions
Alternative rock band Hootie & the Blowfish released a cover of "Goodbye Girl" on their compilation album, The Best of Hootie & the Blowfish: 1993–2003 (2004). Their version was recorded for the television remake of the original film.
British singer-songwriter Rumer released a cover version on her album Seasons of My Soul (2011).

References

1977 songs
1977 singles
David Gates songs
Hootie & the Blowfish songs
Songs written by David Gates
Elektra Records singles